The 1970–71 Cypriot First Division was the 32nd season of the Cypriot top-level football league.

Overview
It was contested by 12 teams, and Olympiakos Nicosia won the championship.  EPA Larnaca FC participated in the Greek championship as the previous year's champions. They finished in 18th position.

League standings

Results

References
Cyprus - List of final tables (RSSSF)

Cypriot First Division seasons
Cypriot First Division, 1970-71
1